Elastin microfibril interfacer 1 (EMILIN-1) is a protein that in humans is encoded by the EMILIN1 gene. It is the best characterized member of the EMILIN family of extracellular matrix glycoproteins.

References

Further reading

External links

Glycoproteins